Giuseppe Paolo Stanislao "Beppo" Occhialini ForMemRS (5 December 1907 – 30 December 1993) was an Italian physicist who contributed to the discovery of the pion or pi-meson decay in 1947 with César Lattes and Cecil Frank Powell, the latter winning the Nobel Prize in Physics for this work. At the time of this discovery, they were all working at the H. H. Wills Laboratory of the University of Bristol.

The X-ray satellite SAX was named BeppoSAX in his honour after its launch in 1996.

Biography 
His father was the physicist Raffaele Augusto Occhialini (1878–1951), a pioneer in the fields of spectroscopy and electronics theory. Giuseppe Paolo Stanislao Occhialini graduated at Florence in 1929. In 1932, he collaborated in the discovery of the positron in cosmic rays at the Cavendish Laboratory of Cambridge, under the leadership of Patrick Blackett, using cloud chambers. 

He returned in Italy in 1934, where he suffered from the political climate generated by fascism. Thus, from 1937 to 1944, following an invitation by Gleb Wataghin, he worked at the Institute of Physics of the University of São Paulo, in Brazil. 

In 1944 he returned to England, working at the Wills Physics Laboratory in Bristol, where he studied cosmic rays.
In 1947, while in Bristol, he contributed to the discovery of the pion or pi-meson decay in collaboration with César Lattes, Cecil Frank Powell and Hugh Muirhead. The discovery was made using the technology of the tracks on specialized photographic emulsions. Powell won the Nobel Prize in Physics in 1950, in large part for this work.

He returned to Italy in 1950, teaching first in Genoa and then in the physics department at the University of Milan in 1952.

He was a protagonist in cosmic ray research with the nuclear utilization of photographic emulsions exposed to high energy cosmic radiation, work which culminated in 1954 with the European G-Stack collaboration, that focused on the decay products of the kaons. Later on with the coming of particle accelerators, Occhialini explored that new field of research. He also made outstanding contributions to space physics, importantly contributing to the foundation of the European Space Agency.

Honors 

 The Department of Physics of the University of Milan-Bicocca, active since 1997, is named after him.
 The satellite SAX, the first Italian satellite for the study of gamma rays, was renamed BeppoSAX from his nickname "Beppo", which is a diminutive for Giuseppe.
 An asteroid, 20081 Occhialini was named for him.
 In 1949 he received the National Prize of the President of the Republic.
 In 1975 he was elected to the American Philosophical Society
 In 1978 he was elected to the United States National Academy of Sciences
 In 1979 he was awarded the Wolf Prize for physics.
 In 2004, Prof. Antonio Vitale, Ordinary Professor of Physics at the University of Bologna, created the "Foundation Giuseppe Occhialini" with its seat at Fossombrone, birth town of Giuseppe Occhialini. The Foundation has as its objective the popularization of physics in the superior schools, and is active above all in the province of Pesaro-Urbino, where every year there is held a course with the allocation of scholarships for the worthiest students.
 In 2007 the Italian Physical Society together with the Institute of Physics instituted the Occhialini Prize to honour his memory.
 On 22 June 2009 a square in Milan square was named after him, that same square where the Institute of Physics was at the time he first became professor there. The sign in the square was unveiled at a ceremony with the deans of both of Milan's state universities, Enrico Decleva and Marcello Fontanesi, Beppo's daughter Etra, and Professor Guido Vegni, one of Beppo's pupils and successors in particle physics research.

Personal 
Beppo Occhialini was an avid mountain climber.  During WW II, staying in Brazil, then a country hostile to Italy, he became an authorized alpine guide in the Parque Nacional do Itatiaia, where there is a peak named "Pico Occhialini".

References

Further reading
 Redondi, Pietro. The Scientific Legacy of Beppo Occhialini. Bologna: Società Italiana di Fisica, Springer, 2006. .

External links

 Giuseppe "Beppo" Occhialini . Agenzia Spaziale Italiana.
 "Ricordando Beppo" (Remembering Beppo). Video on Giuseppe Occhialini's life. Istituto Nazionale di Astrofisica – Italy

1907 births
1993 deaths
20th-century Italian physicists
Wolf Prize in Physics laureates
Academic staff of the University of São Paulo
Academics of the University of Bristol
Foreign Members of the Royal Society
Foreign associates of the National Academy of Sciences
Members of the American Philosophical Society